Ramal de Portalegre, originally called Linha de Portalegre, is a closed railway line which connected the stations of Estremoz, on the Linha de Évora, and Portalegre, on the Linha do Leste. It was planned to connect Estremoz to Castelo de Vide, on the Ramal de Cáceres, but the railway was only built to Portalegre-Gare. The line was opened on 21 January 1949, and closed in 1990.

See also 
 List of railway lines in Portugal
 History of rail transport in Portugal

References

Sources
 

Iberian gauge railways
Railway lines in Portugal
Railway lines opened in 1949
Railway lines closed in 1990